Planet Earth is a 2006 British television series produced by the BBC Natural History Unit. Five years in the making, it was the most expensive nature documentary series ever commissioned by the BBC and also the first to be filmed in high definition. The series received multiple awards, including four Emmy Awards, a Peabody Award, and an award from the Royal Television Society.

Planet Earth premiered on 5 March 2006 in the United Kingdom on BBC One, and by June 2007 had been shown in 130 countries. The original version was narrated by David Attenborough, whilst some international versions used alternative narrators.

The series has eleven episodes, each of which features a global overview of a different biome or habitat on Earth. At the end of each fifty-minute episode, a ten-minute featurette takes a behind-the-scenes look at the challenges of filming the series.

Ten years later, the BBC announced a six-part sequel had been commissioned, titled Planet Earth II, the first television series produced by the BBC in ultra-high-definition (4K). David Attenborough returned as narrator and presenter. A second sequel, Planet Earth III is currently announced and planned to air in 2022.

Background
In 2001 the BBC broadcast The Blue Planet, a series on the natural history of the world's oceans. It received critical acclaim, high viewing figures, audience appreciation ratings, and many awards. It also became a hugely profitable global brand, eventually being sold to 150 countries worldwide. Feedback showed that audiences particularly liked the epic scale, the scenes of new and unusual species and the cinematic quality of the series. Programme commissioners were keen for a follow-up, so Alastair Fothergill decided that the Natural History Unit should repeat the formula with a series looking at the whole planet. The idea for Planet Earth was born, and the series was commissioned by Lorraine Heggessey, then Controller of BBC One, in January 2002.

A feature film version of Planet Earth was commissioned alongside the television series, repeating the successful model established with The Blue Planet and its companion film, Deep Blue. Earth was released around the world from 2007 to 2009. There was also another accompanying television series, Planet Earth: The Future, which looked at the environmental problems facing some of the species and habitats featured in the main series in more detail.

Broadcast
Planet Earth premiered on BBC One on 5 March 2006 in the United Kingdom. On the same day or in the subsequent weeks or months, the series also began airing in several other countries.

International broadcasters carrying Planet Earth include Australia on ABC and GEM, Canada on CBC and CTV, New Zealand on Prime, the Philippines on GMA Network and GMA News TV, the U.S. on Discovery Channel, Velocity, Science, Animal Planet, Destination America and BBC America.

British television
The episodes are each an hour in length, comprising the main programme and a 10-minute featurette called Planet Earth Diaries, which details the filming of a particular event. In the UK, Planet Earth was split into two parts, broadcast in spring and autumn 2006. The first five episodes premiered on BBC One at 9:00 pm on Sundays, beginning on 5 March 2006. The programmes were repeated the following Saturday in an early evening slot on BBC Two. Along with its 2005 dramatisation of Bleak House, the BBC selected Planet Earth for its trial of high-definition broadcasts. The opening episode was its first-ever scheduled programme in the format, shown 27 May 2006 on the BBC HD channel.

The first episode in the autumn series, Great Plains, received its first public showing at the Edinburgh International Television Festival on 26 August 2006. It was shown on a giant screen in Conference Square. The remaining episodes were broadcast from 5 November 2006 in the same primetime BBC One slot, following a further repeat run of the spring programmes on BBC Four. The autumn episodes were broadcast simultaneously on BBC HD and were repeated on BBC Four the following week.

Besides being BBC One's featured One to Watch programme of the day, Planet Earth was heavily trailed on the BBC's television and radio channels both before and during its run. The music that was featured in the BBC trailers for the series is the track "Hoppípolla" from the album Takk... by Icelandic post-rock band Sigur Rós. Following the advertisements, interest was so widespread that the single was re-released. In the United States, the series was promoted using "The Time Has Come" from trailer music company Epic Score, composed by Gabriel Shadid and Tobias Marberger. The Australian trailers initially used Jupiter: The Bringer of Jollity from Gustav Holst's orchestral suite The Planets, but later reverted to "Hoppípolla".

International
The BBC pre-sold the series to several overseas broadcasters, including the Discovery Channel for the United States, the Australian Broadcasting Corporation, the Canadian Broadcasting Corporation, China Central Television, WDR for Germany, Discovery Channel for India, Prime Television for New Zealand, and C1R for Russian broadcasts. The series was eventually sold to 130 countries.

On 25 March 2007, the series began its run on American television on the Discovery network, premiering on the Discovery Channel and Discovery HD Theater. There were a number of revisions to the original British programme. Actress and conservationist Sigourney Weaver was brought in to replace David Attenborough as narrator, as it was thought her familiarity to American audiences would attract more viewers. The Discovery programmes also used a slightly different script to the British original. The series was broadcast on Sundays in one 3-hour block followed by four 2-hour blocks. The Planet Earth Diaries segments were not shown immediately after each episode, but collectively in Planet Earth: The Filmmakers' Story, a two-hour special which was broadcast after the series had finished its initial network run. Edited versions were later broadcast on The Science Channel, Animal Planet, and Planet Green.

In Canada, the series did not air on the Canadian Discovery Channel, as it is owned by CTV and the Canadian rights were exclusively sold to the CBC.

Episodes

Planet Earth: The Future

The latter episodes were supplemented by Planet Earth: The Future, a series of three 60-minute films that highlight the conservation issues surrounding some of the featured species and environments. The programmes are narrated by Simon Poland and the series producer was Fergus Beeley. The series began transmission on BBC Four after the ninth episode, "Shallow Seas".

Feature film

Alongside the commissioning of the television series, BBC Worldwide and GreenLight Media secured financing for a US$15 million film version of Planet Earth. This followed the earlier success of Deep Blue, the BBC's 2003 theatrical nature documentary which used re-edited footage from The Blue Planet. The film was co-directed by Alastair Fothergill and Mark Linfield and produced by Alix Tidmarsh and Sophokles Tasioulis. Only 30% of the footage shown in Earth is new, with the remainder being reworked from the television series to suit the narrative of the film. David Attenborough was replaced as narrator by high-profile actors: Patrick Stewart for the UK market and James Earl Jones for the United States.

Earth had its worldwide premiere in September 2007 at the San Sebastián International Film Festival in San Sebastián, Spain, in Basque Country. Lionsgate released the film in several international markets over the following year. In the United States, it became the first film to be released by Disneynature, the Walt Disney Company's new nature documentary arm. When released on Earth Day 2009 it set the record for the highest opening weekend gross for a nature documentary, and went on to become the third highest grossing documentary of all time. It has grossed more than $108 million worldwide; in the nature documentary genre, only March of the Penguins has achieved greater box-office success.

Reception

Critical reception
Planet Earth received widespread critical acclaim. On review aggregation website Rotten Tomatoes, the miniseries has an approval rating of 95% based on 22 reviews, with an average rating of 9/10. The critical consensus reads "Planet Earth weaves innovative camera techniques and patient observation to deliver viewers an astounding glimpse of the world's perils and wonders, capturing jaw-dropping scenery and animals on both an epic and intimate scale." Time magazine's James Poniewozik named it one of the Top 10 New TV Series of 2007, ranking it at No. 4. In 2019, Planet Earth and its sequel were ranked 72nd on The Guardian'''s list of the 100 best TV shows of the 21st century.

AccoladesPlanet Earth: From Pole to Pole won the Science and Natural History award at the Royal Television Society Programme Awards in 2007. The RTS also awarded it a Judge's Award and a Photography Award at its Craft and Design Awards. The series picked up two awards from the Broadcasting Press Guild for Best Documentary Series and Innovation in Broadcasting, and won Best Documentary Series at the 2007 Broadcast Awards. At the 2007 BAFTA Television Awards, Planet Earth was nominated in the Specialist Factual and Pioneer Audience Award categories, but lost out to Nuremberg: Goering's Last Stand and Life on Mars respectively. It received three nominations at the BAFTA Television Craft Awards later the same year. George Fenton's original score won him Soundtrack Composer of the Year at the 2007 Classical BRIT Awards. Planet Earth was also nominated for the NTA for Most popular Factual program but lost to Top Gear (Supernanny and Bad Lad's Army: Officer Class were also nominated).Planet Earth was recognised by the American television industry, collecting the award for Nonfiction Series at the 59th Primetime Emmy Awards in September 2007 and winning a further three prizes in technical categories at the Creative Arts Emmy Awards. It also collected two awards from the Television Critics Association in Los Angeles in July 2007 and a Peabody Award in April 2008.

The series was also fêted at wildlife film festivals around the globe, collected multiple prizes at the Wildscreen Festival 2006, the International Wildlife Film Festival 2007 and the Jackson Hole Wildlife Film Festival 2007.

Awards and nominations

Audience response
The credentials of the filmmakers, the size of the production, a high-profile marketing campaign and a primetime BBC One timeslot all resulted in Planet Earth attracting large audiences when it debuted in the UK in March 2006. The first episode, "From Pole to Pole", was watched by more people than any natural history programme since Attenborough and Fothergill's previous series, The Blue Planet, in 2001. The first five episodes drew an average audience of 11.4 million viewers, including the early evening repeats, outperforming even The Blue Planet. When the series returned to British screens after a six-month break, it remained popular but viewing figures did not reach the same levels. The final six episodes attracted an average audience of 6.8 million viewers, appreciably lower than the spring episodes, but still higher than BBC One's average for the timeslot. The BBC's 2007 Annual Report revealed that the series "received the highest audience appreciation score of any British programme on TV this year".

In the United States, Planet Earth drew equally impressive ratings when it premiered on Discovery and Discovery HD Theater on 25 March 2007. The first three episodes (screened back to back) averaged 5.72 million viewers with a peak of 6.07 million viewers, giving the network its third highest audience ever. It was also the most watched Discovery programme since The Flight That Fought Back in 2005.

Sequel

In February 2016, the BBC announced a six-part sequel had been commissioned, titled Planet Earth II, for release in late 2016, with Sir David Attenborough returning as narrator and presenter. As with the 2006 series, the trailer features the track 'Hoppipolla' by Icelandic group Sigur Ros.

Merchandise
The popularity of the television series around the world translated into strong sales of associated Planet Earth merchandise. In the United States, it became the fastest and bestselling documentary DVD in Discovery Channel's history, and the high-definition (HD) discs generated US$3.2 million in sales in just two months. By the end of 2007, U.S. sales had topped 3 million units, making it the highest-grossing HD title and one of the top ten DVD titles of the year.

In addition, the brand was licensed to other companies to produce children's books, calendars, a board game, jigsaws, stationery, cards, and more.

DVD
A five-disc DVD box set of the complete series (BBCDVD1883) was released in the UK for Regions 2 and 4 (PAL) on 27 November 2006 by 2 entertain. It is presented in 5.1-channel Dolby Digital surround sound and 16:9 widescreen video. The bonus features include Planet Earth Diaries (presented immediately after each episode as for the original TV broadcast) and Planet Earth: The Future. In the United States, two versions of the same five-disc set were released as a Region 1 (NTSC) DVD on 24 April 2007. The BBC Warner release retained David Attenborough's narration from the original British television broadcasts, but the Discovery Channel edition used the alternative Sigourney Weaver voice-over. Even in the United States the Attenborough version was much the better for sales.

HD DVD and Blu-ray
Except for a small amount of extremely hard-to-obtain footage, Planet Earth was filmed entirely in high-definition, and consequently became one of the first television series to take advantage of the new HD disc formats.

The series was released in both Blu-ray and HD DVD formats as a five-disc Region B box set on 12 November 2007. On the fifth disc, the bonus features from the standard-definition DVD set were replaced by two episodes from the BBC's Natural World series, "Desert Lions" and "Snow Leopard: Beyond the Myth", both also presented in high-definition.

In the United States, the series was released as a four-disc set in both high-definition formats, the Blu-ray version on single-layer BD-25 discs and the HD DVD set on dual-layer HD DVD-30 discs. The first U.S. high-definition releases omitted the extra disc of bonus features from the standard-definition boxed set, though these extras were included with new material in a special-edition Blu-ray released in 2011.

Books
Four official tie-in volumes were published by BBC Books in 2006 and 2007:Planet Earth: As You've Never Seen It Before, written by Alastair Fothergill with a foreword by David Attenborough, was published in hardback on 5 October 2006.
The paperback title Planet Earth: The Future was also published on 5 October 2006. It was edited by Fergus Beeley and Rosamund Kidman Cox with a foreword by Jonathon Porritt.
A second paperback volume revealed some of the tales from the field during filming expeditions. Planet Earth: The Making of an Epic Series was written by David Nicholson-Lord and published on 9 March 2006.
A collection of still images from the series was published in a hardcover volume as Planet Earth: The Photographs on 7 October 2007.

Soundtrack album

On 20 November 2006, a two-disc soundtrack CD was released with a compilation of the incidental music specially commissioned for Planet Earth. The award-winning score was composed by George Fenton and performed by the BBC Concert Orchestra and has been performed during "Planet Earth Live" events in the United States and the United Kingdom.

See alsoPlanet Earth IIThe Blue PlanetBlue Planet IIFrozen PlanetFrozen Planet II
 9° NorthOur PlanetReferences

Further reading
Alastair Fothergill discusses Planet Earth in The Times.
Text at Universal Library discussing the Planet Earth series and the technological background.

External linksPlanet Earth'' at BBC Earth
Discovery Channel website
Planet Earth on the Eden website

2006 British television series debuts
2006 British television series endings
2000s British documentary television series
Discovery Channel original programming
BBC high definition shows
BBC television documentaries
Peabody Award-winning television programs
Nature educational television series
Television series by BBC Studios
Planet Earth (franchise)
Television Academy Honors winners